is a Japanese renju player. He won Renju World Champion in 1997. Up to 2009, Kazuto Kasegawa has been the Japan's Meijin title holder for 6 years.

References 

1963 births
Living people
Renju world champions
Japanese Renju players